Josaia Rabele "Joe" Dakuitoga (born 25 September 1965), also known as Jo Rabele, is a Fijian professional rugby league coach who is the head coach of the Fijian national team, and a former professional rugby league footballer.

In his playing career, Dakuitoga was a founding member of the national team at the 1992 Rugby League World Sevens. He played for the Penrith Panthers and the Sheffield Eagles, and represented Fiji at the 1995 World Cup. He was later the coach of the Fijian team at the 2008 World Cup.

Playing career
Dakuitoga played for the Penrith Panthers in the NSWRL Premiership, playing in seven matches between 1994 and 1995. He was selected for the Fijian squad in the 1995 World Cup. Following this tournament he signed with the Sheffield Eagles along with teammates Waisale Sovatabua and Malakai Yasa Kaunaivalu. Dakuitoga spent two seasons at the Eagles.

Coaching career
While coaching the Nadera Panthers in the Fiji National Rugby League competition Dakuitoga was appointed the domestic national coach in 2007. In 2008 he took the Fijian squad to the 2008 World Cup as head coach.

In August 2020, Dakuitoga was appointed head coach of Fiji ahead of the 2021 World Cup.

References

1965 births
Living people
Expatriate rugby league players in Australia
Expatriate rugby league players in England
Fiji national rugby league team coaches
Fiji national rugby league team players
Fijian expatriate rugby league players
Fijian expatriate sportspeople in Australia
Fijian expatriate sportspeople in England
Fijian rugby league coaches
Fijian rugby league players
I-Taukei Fijian people
Penrith Panthers players
Rugby league second-rows
Rugby league wingers
Sheffield Eagles (1984) players